This is the results breakdown of the local elections held in Asturias on 8 May 1983. The following tables show detailed results in the autonomous community's most populous municipalities, sorted alphabetically.

Overall

City control
The following table lists party control in the most populous municipalities, including provincial capitals (shown in bold). Gains for a party are displayed with the cell's background shaded in that party's colour.

Municipalities

Avilés
Population: 87,996

Gijón
Population: 256,433

Langreo
Population: 56,347

Mieres
Population: 58,718

Oviedo
Population: 184,473

San Martín del Rey Aurelio
Population: 25,761

Siero
Population: 40,350

See also
1983 Asturian regional election

References

Asturias
1983